David Norman Ashdown (1950–2021) was the (9th) Bishop of Keewatin in the Anglican Church of Canada and the 16th Metropolitan of Rupert's Land. He served as mayor of the town of Craik, Saskatchewan, until June 2020. He died June 9, 2021.

References 

Anglican bishops of Keewatin
21st-century Anglican archbishops
Metropolitans of Rupert's Land
2021 deaths
1950 births